The 2004–05 Allsvenskan season was the sixth season of the Allsvenskan, the second level of ice hockey in Sweden. 23 teams participated in the league, and Leksands IF, Skellefteå AIK, IK Nyköping, and IK Oskarshamn qualified for the Kvalserien.

Participating teams

Regular season

Northern Group

Southern Group

SuperAllsvenskan

Qualification round

Northern Group

Southern Group

Playoffs

First round 
 Almtuna IS - Bofors IK 1:2 (4:2, 2:4, 2:4)
 Halmstad Hammers HC - IK Oskarshamn 0:2 (2:5, 1:2)
 Västerås IK - Rögle BK 2:0 (3:1, 1:0 OT)
 Växjö Lakers - IK Nyköping 0:2 (1:3, 2:3)

Second round 
 Västerås IK - IK Nyköping 1:2 (2:0, 0:3, 3:5)
 Bofors IK - IK Oskarshamn 0:2 (2:4, 1:7)

Relegation round

Northern Group

Southern Group

Kvalserien

External links 
 Season on passionhockey.com

Swe
HockeyAllsvenskan seasons
2004–05 in Swedish ice hockey leagues